Zarrin Jub (also Romanized as Zarrīn Jūb; also known as Zarkīnjū, Zarrīn Jow, Zarrīn Jū, and Zarrīnjū) is a village in Howmeh-ye Sarpol Rural District, in the Central District of Sarpol-e Zahab County, Kermanshah Province, Iran. At the 2006 census, its population was 420, in 85 families.

References 

Populated places in Sarpol-e Zahab County